Goshin is a bonsai created by John Y. Naka.

Goshin may also refer to:

Kodokan Goshin Jutsu, a martial arts form
 Gōshin, Japanese nise-e artist